"Faucet Failure" is a single by American rapper Ski Mask the Slump God from his 2018 album Stokeley, released as the only single on April 9, 2019. Prior to being released as a single, a music video was released for the track in February 2019. Later in March, it respectively peaked at numbers 87 and 55 on the US Billboard Hot 100 and the Canadian Hot 100.

Music video
A music video directed by Cole Bennett was released for the song on February 26, 2019. It was called "eccentric, offbeat, and cartoonish" by XXL, as well as "psychedelic" by HotNewHipHop, and features Ski Mask the Slump God punching an elderly man in a durag, and an appearance from an ostrich.

Charts

Weekly charts

Year-end charts

Certifications

References

2019 singles
2018 songs
Ski Mask the Slump God songs
Songs written by Tim Gomringer
Songs written by Kevin Gomringer

Song recordings produced by Cubeatz
Music videos directed by Cole Bennett